Lysurus arachnoideus (Synonym Aseroe arachnoidea) is a species of basidiomycete fungi in the genus Lysurus.

References

Phallales
Taxa named by Johannes Paulus Lotsy